Passive-aggressive behavior is characterized by a pattern of passive hostility and an avoidance of direct communication. Inaction where some action is socially customary is a typical passive-aggressive strategy (showing up late for functions, staying silent when a response is expected).  Such behavior is sometimes protested by associates, evoking exasperation or confusion. People who are recipients of passive-aggressive behavior may experience anxiety due to the discordance between what they perceive and what the perpetrator is saying.

Application

Psychology

In psychology, "passive-aggression" is one of the most misused of psychological terms . After some debate, the American Psychiatric Association dropped it from the list of personality disorders in the DSM IV as too narrow to be a full-blown diagnosis and not well enough supported by scientific evidence to meet increasingly rigorous standards of definition . Culturally, the ambiguous "passive-aggressive" label is misused by lay persons and professionals alike . The removal of the passive-aggressive personality definition from the official diagnostic manual was in large measure because of the frequent misapplication and because of the often contradictory and unclear descriptions clinicians in the field provided .  Most of the definitions which follow (which had previously been classified as passive-aggressive) are often more correctly described as overt aggression, or covert aggression (which is the correct definition to describe subtle, deliberate, calculating and underhanded tactics that manipulators and other disturbed characters use to intimidate, control, deceive and abuse others).

The outdated definition rejected by the American Psychiatric Association is as follows: Passive-aggressive behavior is characterized by a habitual pattern of non-active resistance to expected work requirements, opposition, sullenness, stubbornness, and negative attitudes in response to requirements for normal performance levels expected by others. Most frequently it occurs in the workplace, where resistance is exhibited by indirect behaviors such as procrastination, forgetfulness, and purposeful inefficiency, especially in reaction to demands by authority figures, but it can also occur in interpersonal contexts.

Another source characterizes passive-aggressive behavior as: A personality trait marked by a pervasive pattern of negative attitudes and characterized by passive, sometimes obstructionist resistance to complying with expectations in interpersonal or occupational situations. Behaviors such as learned helplessness, procrastination, stubbornness, resentment, sullenness, or deliberate/repeated failure to accomplish requested tasks for which one is often explicitly responsible.  Other examples of passive-aggressive behavior may include avoiding direct or clear communication, evading problems, fear of intimacy or competition, making excuses, blaming others, obstructionism, playing the victim, feigning compliance with requests, sarcasm, backhanded compliments, and hiding anger.

Conflict theory
In conflict theory, passive-aggressive behavior can resemble a behavior better described as catty, as it consists of deliberate, active, but carefully veiled hostile acts which are distinctively different in character from the non-assertive style of passive resistance.

Work 

Passive-aggressive behavior from workers and managers is damaging to team unity and productivity. In an ad for Warner's online ebook, it says: "The worst case of passive-aggressive behavior involves destructive attitudes such as negativity, sullenness, resentment, procrastination, 'forgetting' to do something, chronic lateness, and intentional inefficiency." If this behavior is ignored, it could result in decreased office efficiency and frustration among workers. If managers are passive-aggressive in their behavior, it can end up stifling team creativity. Paula De Angelis says, "It would actually make perfect sense that those promoted to leadership positions might often be those who on the surface appear to be agreeable, diplomatic and supportive, yet who are actually dishonest, backstabbing saboteurs behind the scenes."

History 
Passive-aggressive behavior was first defined clinically by Colonel William C. Menninger during World War II in the context of men's reaction to military compliance. Menninger described soldiers who were not openly defiant but expressed their civil disobedience (what he called "aggressiveness") by “passive measures, such as pouting, stubbornness, procrastination, inefficiency, and passive obstructionism" due to what Menninger saw as an "immaturity" and a reaction to "routine military stress".

According to some psychoanalytic views, noncompliance is not indicative of true passive-aggressive behavior, which may instead be defined as the manifestation of emotions that have been repressed based on a self-imposed need for acceptance.

See also 

 Antisocial personality disorder
 Counterproductive work behavior
 Dark triad
 Gaming the system
 Gossip
 Guilt trip
 Let the Wookiee win
 Malicious compliance
 Mind games
 Narcissistic personality disorder
 Neglect
 Nonviolent resistance
 One-upmanship
 Oppositional defiant disorder
 Passivity
 Psychological manipulation
 Relational aggression
 Silent treatment
 Qahr and ashti, Iranian "silent treatment" 
 Social undermining
 Work to rule

References

Bibliography 
 .
 .
 
 Femenia, N. & Warner, N. (2012),The Silent Marriage: How Passive Aggression Steals Your Happiness (The Complete Guide to Passive Aggression) [Kindle Edition]|

External links
What is Passive Aggressive Behavior and How To Nip it in the Bud

Aggression
Borderline personality disorder
Defence mechanisms
Human behavior
Motivation
Protest tactics
Symptoms and signs of mental disorders